Marian Salzman (born February 15, 1959) is an American advertising and public relations executive. She is Senior Vice President, Global Communications for Philip Morris International, a tobacco company. She was formerly CEO of Havas PR North America and chaired the Global Collective, the organizing collaborative of all of the PR assets of Havas.  She rejoined Euro RSCG in August 2009, having previously worked for the holding company as executive vice president, chief strategic officer, from January 2001 to October 2004.

Career
Salzman is a graduate of Brown University. She began her career working on the development of new research methodologies, from slumber parties for tweenagers, a project for Levi Strauss & Co. in 1991, to the creation of Cyberdialogue in 1992, to leverage instant messaging and AOL chat rooms for social research.

1992: Co-founded Cyberdialogue, the world’s first online market research company, with partners Jay Chiat and Tom Cohen
1993–1995: Director of consumer insights and emerging media at Chiat\Day
1995–1997: Worldwide director of TBWA’s Department of the Future
1997–2000: President, Intelligence Factory, Young & Rubicam
2001–2004: Executive vice president and chief strategy officer at Euro RSCG Worldwide
2005–March 2008: Executive vice president and chief marketing officer at JWT Worldwide (member of 12-person worldwide executive committee)
March 2008–August 2009: Partner and chief marketing officer at Porter Novelli (member of 10-person worldwide executive committee)
2009–present: President then CEO of Euro RSCG Worldwide PR North America, now called Havas PR (member of Euro RSCG Worldwide Executive Committee with oversight for global communications and reputation); became chairman, the Havas Global PR Collective in 2012

Media contributions
In 1998 in an interview with Fast Company magazine, Salzman drew attention to “experience collections,” the idea that people are placing less value on material goods and more on personal and professional experiences and skills.

The New York Times published a Sunday feature, “Metrosexuals Come Out,” which quoted Salzman regarding metrosexuals. In 2003 the UK Observer apologized for incorrectly attributing the first use of the term to Salzman, and gave credit to Mark Simpson (journalist) for the term.

In 2007, she talked about how “sleep is the new sex” for The Economist’s annual predictions and stated that lowering home values would drive consumers away from recreational shopping and toward a “less is more” mindset.

Activism
In 2015, Salzman signed an open letter which the ONE Campaign had been collecting signatures for; the letter was addressed to Angela Merkel and Nkosazana Dlamini-Zuma, urging them to focus on women as they serve as the head of the G7 in Germany and the AU in South Africa respectively.

Personal life
Salzman relocated to Lausanne, Switzerland for the job with Philip Morris. She is married to Jim Diamond and formerly lived in Stamford, Connecticut.

References

Businesspeople from New York City
Brown University alumni
Harvard University alumni
Living people
American public relations people
20th-century American Jews
People from Bergen County, New Jersey
People from Lausanne
American women chief executives
1959 births
21st-century American Jews
20th-century American women
21st-century American women